Tales Don't Tell Themselves is the third album by Welsh post-hardcore band Funeral for a Friend. It charted at #3 in the UK selling 25,000 copies in its first week and later went silver.

It was released on 14 May 2007. Before the release of the album, the band released several short studio update videos informing fans of their progress. During the recording of the album, Matt Davies used the same microphone he used to record the group's first album Casually Dressed and Deep in Conversation and Ryan Richards recorded his drum parts by recording cymbals separately from the rest of his drum parts and replacing the normal cymbals with electric ones whilst recording basic drums. Davies plays guitar on several of the songs; this is the first album in which he has done so.

On 13 February 2007, the band released the track "Out of Reach" as a taster for fans. The lead single from the album, "Into Oblivion (Reunion)", was released on 7 May 2007. The song was first played on The Zane Lowe rock show on 19 March and the official music video was uploaded to the band's MySpace page shortly after. According to Davies, speaking at a performance at Manchester's Apollo Theatre, the second single from the album is to be "Walk Away".

The album was released in Japan with two bonus tracks: "Rise and Fall" and "Crash and Burn (Home Demo)"; which were also sold as bonus tracks on iTunes.

Concept and themes 
Davies has mentioned that it is a concept album:

The video for Walk Away was played on 8 June 2007 on Kerrang! TV. The video concerns the missing fisherman around whom the album is based. It follows his wife and daughter both breaking down. The video ends with the mother realising she cannot go on like this and trying to continue with her life. There are also scenes of Davies singing on a couch. The video was added to the Kerrang! playlist.

Reception

Tales Don't Tell Themselves received mixed reception from music critics. At Metacritic, which assigns a normalized rating out of 100 to reviews from mainstream critics, the album received an average score of 52, based on 6 reviews, which indicates "Mixed or average reviews".

Track listing

Charts

References

2007 albums
Funeral for a Friend albums
Atlantic Records albums
Albums produced by Gil Norton